Microcentrum is a genus of phaneropterid bushcrickets, sometimes known as "angle-wing katydids" and found in the Americas.

Species 
The Orthoptera Species File lists the following Microcentrum species:

Microcentrum angustatum Narrowed angle-wing katydid from South America and the Caribbean
Microcentrum bicentenarium from Southeastern Brazil
Microcentrum californicum California angle-wing katydid
Microcentrum championi Champion angle-wing katydid from Panama
Microcentrum concisum from Panama
Microcentrum costaricense Costa Rican angle-wing katydid
Microcentrum gurupi from Eastern Brazil
Microcentrum incarnatum Larger angle-wing katydid from the Southeastern United States
Microcentrum irregulare Irregular angle-wing katydid from far-western Brazil
Microcentrum lanceolatum Lance angle-wing katydid from Brazil
Microcentrum latifrons Southwestern angle-wing katydid
Microcentrum linki from southern Brazil
Microcentrum louisianum Louisiana angle-wing katydid found in Louisiana, Mississippi and Tennessee
Microcentrum lucidum Bright angle-wing katydid from northeastern Brazil
Microcentrum malkini from Suriname
Microcentrum marginatum Bordered angle-wing katydid from northeastern Brazil
Microcentrum micromargaritiferum Mini-pearl katydid from Brazil
Microcentrum minus Texas angle-wing katydid
Microcentrum myrtifolium Myrtle-leaf katydid from Central and South America
Microcentrum nauticum from Northern Brazil
Microcentrum navigator from Northern Brazil
Microcentrum nigrolineatum Black-lined angle-wing katydid from Bolivia
Microcentrum philammon from Central America and Colombia
Microcentrum punctifrons from French Guiana
Microcentrum retinerve lesser angle-wing katydid found in the eastern United States
Microcentrum rhombifolium greater angle-wing or broadwing katydid found in the United States and Mexico
Microcentrum securiferum from Panama
Microcentrum simplex from Central America
Microcentrum stylatum from Mexico
Microcentrum suave Smooth angle-wing katydid from Northwest Mexico
Microcentrum surinamense Surinam angle-wing katydid 
Microcentrum syntechnoides from Central America
Microcentrum totonacum Totonaca katydid from Mexico
Microcentrum triangulatum from the Caribbean Sea
Microcentrum veraguae Varagua katydid from the Trinidad River, Panama
Microcentrum w-signatum from southeastern Brazil

References

External links
 

Tettigoniidae genera